The 2001 FIA European Super Touring Championship was the 28th season of European touring car racing and the first European Touring Car Championship since 1988. The championship started at Monza on 1 April and ended after ten events at Estoril on 21 October. The championship was won by Fabrizio Giovanardi driving for Alfa Romeo Team Nordauto in an Alfa Romeo 156. A secondary championship for Super Production cars was run alongside the ETCC and was won by Peter Kox driving for Ravaglia Motorsport in a BMW 320i.

Teams and drivers

Super Touring

Super Production

Results and standings

Races

Standings

Super Touring

Drivers' Championship
Points were awarded on a 40, 35, 32, 30, 28, 26, 24, 23, 22, etc. basis to the top 30 finishers in each race. No bonus points were awarded for pole positions or fastest laps. All scores counted towards the championship.

Teams' Championship
Points were awarded on a 40, 35, 32, 30, 28, 26, 24, 23, 22, etc. basis to the top 30 finishers in each race, however only the two highest placed cars from each team scored points. No bonus points were awarded for pole positions or fastest laps. All scores counted towards the championship.

Amateurs' Trophy
Points were awarded on a 40, 35, 32, 30, 28, 26, 24, 23, 22, etc. basis to the top 30 finishers in each race. No bonus points were awarded for pole positions or fastest laps. All scores counted towards the championship.

Super Production

Drivers' Championship
Points were awarded on a 20, 15, 12, 10, 8, 6, 4, 3, 2, 1 basis to the top 10 finishers in each race. No bonus points were awarded for pole positions or fastest laps. All scores counted towards the championship.

Teams' Championship
Points were awarded on a 20, 15, 12, 10, 8, 6, 4, 3, 2, 1 basis to the top 10 finishers in each race, however only the two highest placed cars from each team scored points. No bonus points were awarded for pole positions or fastest laps. All scores counted towards the championship.

Under 25 Trophy
Points were awarded on a 20, 15, 12, 10, 8, 6, 4, 3, 2, 1 basis to the top 10 finishers in each race. No bonus points were awarded for pole positions or fastest laps. All scores counted towards the championship.

References

External links
 FIATouringCars.com

European Touring Car Championship seasons
European Touring Car Championship
2001 in European sport